The phrase Big 12 basketball tournament may refer to:

Big 12 men's basketball tournament
Big 12 women's basketball tournament